Tenore di Bitti "Mialinu Pira" is an Italian ensemble formed in 1995, specialized in the Sardinian cantu a tenore. The Cantu a tenore is a style of polyphonic folk singing characteristic of the Barbagia region of the island, even though some other Sardinian sub-regions bear examples of such tradition. The cantu a tenore was proclaimed by the UNESCO "Masterpieces of the Oral and Intangible Heritage" in 2005.

Biography
The Tenores di Bitti "Mialinu Pira" have a special place among the many groups in Sardinia. Having a style which is slightly less rough than that of other styles, exemplary researchers in their heritage, impeccable executors with exceptional vocal quality, adorable people, they have reached a level of excellence and of admiration which is without equal in Sardinia and in the whole world. Their frequent performances on so many national television programs are to be remembered. In the last few years they've been touring extensively Europe (France, Germany, Denmark, Norway, Czech Republic, Spain, Belgium, Nederland, Austria, Luxembourg, Slovenia, Swiss, Ireland, Croatia, Serbia, Lithuania, Estonia, Poland, Tunisia, Hungary, United Arab Emirates, Brazil and Japan). It is also remarkable their participation in 2001 to the Christmas Concert in the Vatican for the Pope John Paul II, the concert in May 2009 in the Concertgebouw Theater in Amsterdam and in December in the Church of the Nativity in Bethlehem.

The Tenores di Bitti "Mialinu Pira", having performed for so many years, is nowadays considered from music-fans and ethno-musicologists the most prominent example of this vocal art. There are many points that make them so special : the cantu a tenore is still well alive in Sardinia performed by many groups, most of them are old singers performing traditional texts. Their young age is a first approach to notice how their sound, harsh and ancestral, is in fact very homogeneous. Their perfect tuning and their powerful sound is very rare today, because this skill needs years of practice and passion to be performed at its best.

Another matter to be pointed is their accuracy in choosing lyrics. Both in dancing (lestru, dillu, seriu, passu torrau,) and slow (isterrita, boch'e notte) forms, the lyrics, by famous poets or from misknown contemporary authors, make the repertoire of Tenores di Bitti "Mialinu Pira" an important vehicle of literary transmission. These songs are profane poems speaking about the shepherds and their solitude in touch with the nature, referring to the popular world and its traditions. The religious' songs are performed in church, in particular, moments of the liturgical year (Christmas, Easter or patronal feasts) or during the religious processions through the street of the village of Bitti. The Grobbes and some lullabies for Baby Jesus (su Nenneddu) belong to this repertoire.

The "a tenore song"
The Tenores singing (cantu a tenore) is one of the more ancient ways of singing in the Mediterranean area. Nothing about its origins is sure, but the historians maintain that this traditional polyphony goes back to 3000 years ago.... The singing is made a cappella by four male voices (oche, mesu oche, bassu and contra), the main feature of this polyphony is represented by basso and contra because of their guttural and ancestral sound. The Tenores singing from Bitti, in the centre of Sardinia, is a unique vocal style. It immediately succeeds in sounding primitive and strong. It is no mere coincidence that the experts think that it may have had its origin in primitive times as an imitation of nature: the four voices of which the choir is composed is no more than the lowing of cattle, the bleating of sheep and the sound of the wind. These were harmonised and given poetic lyrics of age-old beauty. The guttural use of voices and the typical songs of intonation, cannot be confused with anything else and make this millenary art have great impact. A magic of the human voice. The a Tenore Song was proclaimed by the Unesco "Masterpieces of the Oral and Intangible Heritage" in 2005.

Members
 Bachisio Pira - Oche e Mesu Oche
 Arcangelo Pittudu - Oche e Mesu Oche
 Omar Bandinu - Bassu
 Marco Serra - Contra

Awards 
 2003 - Prix Maria Carta

Discography
 CD "Su Monte 'e Mesus" recorded and mixed in Rockhouse Blu Studio (Sassari). MC 1998, CD 2000
 CD "Tenores" VOL. 1 compilation recorded and mixed in Live Studio by Marco Luzzu and Giovanni Carlini. Cagliari 2003
 CD  "Musica Sacra International" live recording Germany in Martin's church in Kaufbeuren St. (Germany) on 29 May 2004 
 CD Highlights of the 51st Cork International Choral Festival 2005 'Ethnic & Other Voices'
 CD e DVD, Orchestra mediterranea, live recording in San Paolo of Brasil on 2005 
 CD Ost Soundtrack 'Meine schöne Bescherung'. Colonia (Germania) 2007 
 CD Cunzertos (concerts live). TDB Mialinu Pira, Italia 2013

External links
 Sito ufficiale tenoresdibitti.com
 Sito ufficiale tenoresdibitti.it
 Sito dei Tenores su Myspace
 Fans club "Battor Moros"
 Didactic video about the voices of tenore 
 
 Intervista ai Tenores di Bitti "Mialinu Pira" (audio)

Italian folk music groups
Music in Sardinia
Italian choirs
Throat singing
Musical groups established in 1995